Welcome to the Blacklist Club is the debut studio album by American singer-songwriter, Evan Taubenfeld. It was released on May 18, 2010 by Sire Records, being Taubenfeld's only release with the label.

Background
Taubenfeld was originally scheduled to release his debut studio album, Just Sign Here... in early 2006, although inner turmoil and creative differences between Warner Brothers Records and Taubenfeld would result in this effort being scrapped. However, Taubenfeld would continue to record music, now enlisting the assistance of John Fields, which would ultimately be released in 2010 as Welcome to the Blacklist Club.

When speaking on the record, Taubenfeld described it as "being [about] a hopeless romantic trapped under a cinnamon-coated shell that is L.A., I think your outside hardens when you live out here. Most people don’t express how much they want to fall in love. For me, half the album is about being able to expose that. The other half...is more about having fun".

Singles
 "Cheater of the Year" was released as a promotional single on February 24 to iTunes and other digital download websites. An accompanying lyric video was also released onto Myspace.
 "Boy Meets Girl" released on March 31, 2009 was the first official single for the album. A lyric video was created for this song as well.
 "Starbucks Girl" was released on February 9, and a music video was also put up.
 "Pumpkin Pie" is the single which was released in 2010 in support of the album. There is a lyric video for this with an actual video released in July 2010.

Other songs
 On August 12, a video for "It's Like That" was released on the Evan Taubenfeld website, as a reward to the fans for getting "Boy Meets Girl" to one million plays on Myspace. However, although it has a video, it has not yet been released in single format. The video, unlike the previous videos, is not a lyric video, and features clips of Evan in various places singing the song, and many photographs of his friends and fanbase, which were sent to him prior to the creation of the video.

Promotional touring

Snakes and Suits Acoustic Tour
Prior to the release of the album, around Spring 2009, Evan toured with This Providence and The Academy Is... on the Snakes and Suits acoustic tour in promotion of the current single, Boy Meets Girl, and his debut album and career. He played a set of five songs on most tour dates.
 "Razorblade Limeade"
 "Cheater of the Year"
 "Story of Me and You"
 "Pumpkin Pie"
 "Boy Meets Girl"

Metro Station support
In summer/fall of 2009, he is touring in North America with Metro Station.

Planned world tour
In various videos, Evan has suggested that he has plans to go on a world tour after the release of Welcome to the Blacklist Club, probably either Winter or Spring 2010.

Avril Lavigne Black Star Tour
Evan played as an opening act for Avril Lavigne on the North American Leg of her 2011 Black Star World Tour.

Track listing

Personnel

 Evan Taubenfeld - Vocals, guitar, bass, piano, programming, additional production
 Devin Bronson - Guitar
 Mike Castonguay - Bass
 Isaac Carpenter - Drums
 John Fields - Keyboards, additional guitars, bass, background vocals, producer, engineer, mixer
 Kevin Kadish - Programming, keyboards, guitar, additional production, engineering
 Dorian Crozier - Drums
 Stephen Lu - String arrangements, keyboards
 Drew Taubenfeld - Additional guitars
 Avril Lavigne - Background vocals
 Will Owsley - Background vocals
 John Taylor - Background vocals
 Jason Scheff - Background vocals
 Jimmy Coup - Background vocals
 Chuck Gladfelter - Background vocals
 Ross Hogarth - Engineer
 Tom Lord-Alge - Mixer
 Steve Ferlazzo - Arranger

Charts

References

2009 debut albums
Albums produced by John Fields (record producer)
Reprise Records albums
Sire Records albums